Ceratocephala is a flowering plant genus in the family Ranunculaceae.

References

External links 

Ranunculaceae genera
Ranunculaceae